The Africans were a Jamaican reggae group of the 1970s, who recorded on the Federal Records and Belmont labels.

Discography
"Cock Mouth Kill Cock" / Joe Higgs B: "The World Upside Down" - Roosevelt  1971
"Sleeping In The Rain" / B: "Version" - Federal 1973
"Why Worry" / B: "Why Worry Version"  - Federal 1973	 
"Sweet Mary Lou" / B: "Gratitude" - Federal 1973
"Get Wey De Duck Get" / B: "Quack! Quack!" - Federal 1975
"Tribulation" / Sky Nation B: "Trial Dub" - High Note Jamaica 1975
"Gathering" / B: "Version" - Wild Flower Jamaica 	1975	 
"King Of The Congo" / B: "Congo Dub" - High Note Jamaica	 1976	 
"Cool In Down" / B: "Cool In Version" - High Note 	1977	 
"Earth Runnings" / B: "Version" - Star Light City Jamaica	 1979 
"Kong Pow" / Joe Gibbs And The Professionals B: "Maroon Rock" - 	Belmont Jamaica		1979
"Over In Zion" / B: "Version" - Starlight City Jamaica		1979
"Life In The Ghetto" / B: Ghetto Version - African Records	1980 
"Final Blow" / B: "Final Blow Pt. 2" - Nura Jamaica

References

Jamaican reggae musical groups
Federal Records artists